WGXC is a community radio station licensed to Acra, New York, United States, and owned by Wave Farm. The station broadcasts at 90.7 MHz from a directional antenna, and serves Greene and Columbia Counties in New York.

History
The station has held the WGXC calls since its license in 2009. However, the radio station began as an online-only venture on May 9, 2009. A terrestrial signal officially went on the air on February 26, 2011.

See also
List of community radio stations in the United States

References

External links

GXC
Community radio stations in the United States
Radio stations established in 2011
2011 establishments in New York (state)